Khomsar (also known as Komsar) is a village in Hend Khaleh Rural District, Tulem District, Sowme'eh Sara County, Gilan Province, Iran. At the 2006 census, its population was 160, in 57 families.

References 

Populated places in Sowme'eh Sara County